Leandro Sebastián Vega (born 27 May 1996) is an Argentine football player who currently plays for Emelec as a centre back.

He also played for the Argentine National Youth Football Team (Under 15, Under-17 and now plays for the Argentina national under-20 football team.

Career
His debut on the River Plate's first-team was on the Victory at the 2015 Copa EuroAmericana Match, where River Plate's team Won the tournament Against the Sevilla FC (one of the teams that play in Spain's top flight, La Liga)

In July 2018, Vega joined C.S. Emelec on loan from River Plate. On 20 March 2019 it was confirmed, that Emelec had acquired the player on a permanent basis. Vega penned a 4-year contract with the club.

References

External links 
 
 Leandro Vega profile at goal.com
 

1996 births
Living people
Sportspeople from Buenos Aires Province
Argentine footballers
Argentine expatriate footballers
Club Atlético River Plate footballers
Newell's Old Boys footballers
San Martín de San Juan footballers
C.S. Emelec footballers
C.D. Antofagasta footballers
Argentine Primera División players
Chilean Primera División players
Expatriate footballers in Chile
Expatriate footballers in Ecuador
Argentina youth international footballers
Argentina under-20 international footballers
Association football defenders
Footballers at the 2016 Summer Olympics
Olympic footballers of Argentina